South Korean boy band BTS debuted on the music scene in June of 2013. They have since released or featured in 72 music videos, and released 49 video albums. Known for their high quality music videos—and accompanying choreography therein—the band have achieved multiple world records with several of these, additionally winning various domestic and international awards for them. They have also appeared in commercials for brands such as  Puma, Fila, and Samsung, among others.

BTS promoted the release of their debut single album 2 Cool 4 Skool (2013) with two music videos, for the singles "No More Dream" and "We Are Bulletproof Pt.2". This was followed by the release of their debut extended play (EP) O!RUL8,2? in September, which yielded the single "N.O" and an accompanying music video. In 2014, the music video for the band's single "Danger" garnered significant attention for its strong choreography; in particular, the neck-grab and shoulder move. The subsequent remix of the single's Japanese version, with Vietnamese pianist Thanh Bui, marked the first time another artist appeared in a BTS music video. In 2015, the band began their BTS Universe storyline with the release of the "I Need U" music video.

In Japan, BTS is the best-selling foreign artist of all-time for video releases, with eight of their concert recordings achieving number-one on Oricon's overall DVD and Blu-ray sales chart, as of October 2022. These recordings have all received gold certification from the Recording Industry Association of Japan (RIAJ) for selling over 100,000 copies each. The band's first video release to be certified was the 2019 BTS World Tour: Love Yourself ~Japan Edition~ DVD, which also became their first to attain platinum certification, in July 2022, for surpassing 250,000 sales.

Music videos

2010s

2020s

Other videos

Albums

Live video albums

Other video albums

Filmography

Films

Television

Online shows

Exhibitions

Notes

References

External links 
 

Videography
Videographies of South Korean artists